Human biodiversity may refer to:
Human genetic variation
(Within certain alt-right groups): Pseudoscientific views on human genetic variation
See: scientific racism, Human Biodiversity Institute